Kurkura is a town and a municipal committee in Gumla district in the Indian state of Jharkhand. The town is located about 143 km from Ranchi on National Highway 1 and is well connected to rail routes as well.

Geography
Kurkura is located at  southern Jharkhand.

Transport
Kurkura is well connected via Rail and Road routes.

Railway
By rail it is on the main BG line that connects the Ranchi to Rourkela.
Kurkura is now well connected with major cities of India via rail routes and one of the most profitable station in South Eastern Railways. Kurkura railway station with station code KRKR.

Roadways
Kurakura is well connected to other cities by district road Salgutu — Kurkura Road.

References

Cities and towns in Khunti district